Carangas is one of nine parishes (administrative divisions) in Ponga, a municipality within the province and autonomous community of the Principality of Asturias, in northern Spain.

The population is 11 (INE 2011).

Villages and hamlets
 Carangas 
 Sotos

References

Parishes in Ponga